HMS Niger (J442) was a reciprocating engine-powered  during the Second World War.

Design and description

The ships' complement consisted of 85 officers and ratings.

The reciprocating ships had two vertical triple-expansion steam engines, each driving one shaft, using steam provided by two Admiralty three-drum boilers.

The Algerine class was armed with a QF  Mk V anti-aircraft gun and four twin-gun mounts for Oerlikon 20 mm cannon. The latter guns were in short supply when the first ships were being completed and they often got a proportion of single mounts. By 1944, single-barrel Bofors 40 mm mounts began replacing the twin 20 mm mounts on a one for one basis. All of the ships were fitted for four throwers and two rails for depth charges.

Construction and career
The ship was ordered on 9 June 1943 at the Lobnitz & Company at Renfrew, Scotland. She was laid down on 5 November 1944 and launched on 1 May 1945. The ship was commissioned on 21 September 1945.

In 1966, she was put on the disposal list and sold to BISCO for scrap in Silloth.

References

Bibliography
 
 
 Peter Elliott (1977) Allied Escort Ships of World War II. MacDonald & Janes,

External links

 

Algerine-class minesweepers of the Royal Navy
Ships built on the River Clyde
1945 ships
World War II minesweepers of the United Kingdom